Kalininaul is the name of several rural localities in the Republic of Dagestan, Russia:
Kalininaul, Kazbekovsky District, Republic of Dagestan, a selo in Kazbekovsky District
Kalininaul, Nogaysky District, Republic of Dagestan, a selo in Arslanbekovsky Selsoviet of Nogaysky District
Kalininaul, Tlyaratinsky District, Republic of Dagestan, a selo in Kardibsky Selsoviet of Tlyaratinsky District